The Kennedy Experience is a music group and eponymous instrumental album conceived and produced in 1999 by violinist Nigel Kennedy. The album is largely derived from the music of rock guitarist Jimi Hendrix and  the title references his group The Jimi Hendrix Experience. According to a BBC interview with Kennedy, the violinist stated that the recording is "an album of music inspired by Jimi Hendrix. It is an extended instrumental work in six movements, each movement a classical interpretation of a Hendrix song". On the recording, Kennedy is accompanied by seven other musicians, and the lineup includes two cellos, an oboe, two guitars, a Dobro, flute, and double bass. With cellist Lynn Harrell, he has recorded an album of duets.

Track listing

References

External links

"Nigel Kennedy talks Bach, Ellington and Hendrix", The Music Show by Andrew Ford, 20 February 2010, Radio National, Australian Broadcasting Corporation

1999 classical albums
Nigel Kennedy albums
Sony Classical Records albums
Jimi Hendrix tribute albums